Ásweed's Return is one of the most famous Saudi television series in the Arab world. This series was produced in 1985, by ARA of artistic production, directed  by Adnan Ibrahim (Iraqi director) and authored by Mohammed Al-Tawayan, both the participated from Saudi Arabia and Syria. Although the series is short, it was thoroughly enjoyed by its viewers.

Synopsis

The story of the show is about a Bedouin tribe and its sheikh (Abo Asweed), who is bedridden, and he mutters about something in a box, and he wants to give the box to a certain person. Shortly after, all the tribesmen is on the pursuit of this box.

Starring
 Mohammed Al-Tawayan
Mohammad Al-Ali
Muna Wassef
Rashid Al Shamrani
Nasir Al-Gasabi
 Abdullah Al-Sadhan
 Mohammed Al-Kanhal
 Amanah Wali
 Khalid Al-Salm
 Salwa Noor al-Din
 Khaled Sami

Direction
 Adnan Ibrahim

References

1985 Saudi Arabian television series debuts
1985 Saudi Arabian television series endings
1980s Saudi Arabian television series